Stay is the tenth studio album by British pop group Simply Red. It was released on 12 March 2007 in the UK and entered the official charts at No. 4. Stay features 10 original tracks and a cover version of "Debris" by The Faces.

Track listing 
Credits adapted from Simply Red's official website.

2014 Remastered & expanded version bonus tracks 

DVD
Feature Interview
 "Mark Goodier Interviews Mick Hucknall About "Stay" – March 2014"
Promo Videos
 "Oh! What A Girl!"
 "So Not Over You"	
 "Stay (Live)"
 "So Not Over You (Live)"
Bonus Feature
 "Stay Album EPK"
BBC TV Appearances
 "Oh! What A Girl! (Later... with Jools Holland, Broadcast on 18 May 2007)"
 "They Don't Know (Later... with Jools Holland, Broadcast on 18 May 2007)"

Notes
 signifies a co-producer
 signifies an additional producer

Singles 
 "Oh! What a Girl!" (September 2006)
 "So Not Over You" (5 March 2007)
 "Stay" (28 May 2007) ("Stay" received popular Club Mixes from 7th Heaven.)
 "The World and You Tonight" (October 2007)

Charts

Weekly charts

Year-end charts

Certifications

Musicians 

By this point in the band's career, "Simply Red" was essentially a trade name for Mick Hucknall, who appeared to be the only permanent member of the group.  The Stay album credits simply list the musicians who played on the album in alphabetical order, with no listing of what instruments they may have played, or which tracks they may have played on. Oddly, Hucknall himself does not appear on the album's list of musicians.

Credited musicians are:
Dave Bloor – percussion programming (1, 5)
Sarah Brown
Anthea Clarke
Dave Clayton
Gavin Goldberg
Simon Hale
Geoff Holyrode
Mark Jaimes
Dee Johnson
Jilly Johnson
John Johnson
Ian Kirkham
Pete Lewinson
Steve Lewinson
Chris De Margary
Jim McWiliam
Willie Fister
Patrick Murdock
Kevin Robinson
Danny Saxon
Morton Schjolin
Kenji Suzuki
Andy Wright
The London Session Orchestra, led by Gavyn Wright

Production 
 Andy Scade – recording 
 Alan Douglas – recording (1, 3, 6)
 Gavin Goldberg – recording (1, 2, 4, 5)
 Dave Bloor – recording (2, 4, 5)
 Michael Zimmerling – recording (2, 4, 5, 7-11)
 Johnny Wow – mixing 
 Pete Craigie – additional mix engineer (1, 3)
 Kevin Metcalfe – mastering at The Soundmasters (London, UK)
 Peacock Design – art direction, design 
 Hamish Brown – photography 
 Andy Dodd and Ian Grenfell, assisted by Andrea Mills in association with Lisa Barbaris – Worldwide Management

References

External links

2007 albums
Self-released albums
Simply Red albums